Milonga may refer to
 Milonga (music)
 Milonga (dance)
 Milonga (dance event)
 Milonga (film)
Milonga a track from the 2008 album Redenção by Brazilian  rock band Fresno
Milonga, a piece by Jorge Cardoso